Inès Boubakri (born 28 December 1988) is a Tunisian foil fencer. She is a four-time Olympian, who won a bronze medal at the 2016 Summer Olympics, and is a member of Association sportive de Bourg-la-Reine in France, under head coach Yann Detienne.

Career
Boubakri represented Tunisia at the 2008 Summer Olympics in Beijing, where she competed in the women's individual foil event. She lost the first preliminary round match to Chinese-born Canadian fencer and former Olympic gold medalist Jujie Luan with a score of 9–13.

At the 2012 Summer Olympics in London, Boubakri qualified for the second time in the women's individual foil event. Unlike her previous Olympics, she excelled through the preliminary rounds by defeating United States' Nicole Ross, and France's Astrid Guyart. Boubakri reached the quarterfinal match of this event, where she was defeated by Italian fencer and three-time Olympic champion Valentina Vezzali, who scored a point during the "sudden death minute" leading to a final score of 7–8.

Four years later, at the 2016 Summer Olympics in Rio de Janeiro, she became the first Tunisian as well as the first African and Arab woman to win an Olympic medal in fencing when she won the bronze, on her way to the medal she beat Noura Mohamed from Egypt, Japanese fencer Shiho Nishioka and then Canadian Eleanor Harvey before losing in the semi-finals to the reigning Olympic Champion from Italy Elisa Di Francisca, in the medal match she was up against the Russian Aida Shanayeva. She won 15-11 after being down by 4–7 in the first period.

She competed at the 2020 Summer Olympics in the women's individual foil.

Family
In 2014 Boubakri married French fencer Erwann Le Péchoux, who also won a medal at the 2016 Summer Olympics.

See also
Muslim women in sport

References

External links
Profile – FIE
NBC Olympics Profile

Tunisian female foil fencers
Living people
Olympic fencers of Tunisia
Fencers at the 2008 Summer Olympics
Fencers at the 2012 Summer Olympics
Fencers at the 2016 Summer Olympics
Fencers at the 2020 Summer Olympics
Sportspeople from Tunis
1988 births
Olympic bronze medalists for Tunisia
Olympic medalists in fencing
Medalists at the 2016 Summer Olympics
Mediterranean Games silver medalists for Tunisia
Mediterranean Games bronze medalists for Tunisia
Competitors at the 2009 Mediterranean Games
Competitors at the 2013 Mediterranean Games
Tunisian expatriates in France
Mediterranean Games medalists in fencing
Competitors at the 2019 African Games
African Games medalists in fencing
African Games gold medalists for Tunisia
20th-century Tunisian women
21st-century Tunisian women